Andorra first competed in the Summer Olympic Games at the 1976 Summer Olympics in Montreal, Quebec, Canada.

Boxing

Shooting

References
Official Olympic Reports
sports-reference

Nations at the 1976 Summer Olympics
1976 Summer Olympics
1976 in Andorra